Migabac is a Papuan language spoken in Morobe Province, Papua New Guinea.

Phonology

Vowels

Consonants (orthographic)

References

Languages of Morobe Province
Huon languages